Antisyntagmatarchis (abbreviated Ανχης)  is used in the Greek language to mean "Lieutenant Colonel". A typical responsibility of an Antisyntagmatarchis is to exercise command of a battalion. Officers holding this rank should be addressed as "Kyrie Diikita" (Κύριε διοικητά) (stressed on the last syllable), by their subordinates when they exercise battalion command or "Kyrie Antisyntagmatarcha" (Κύριε Αντισυνταγματάρχα) (stressed on the syllable before last) in other cases.

The term was first used in the Greek War of Independence (1821 - 1827). The earliest known written use occurred in revolutionary government papers of 1822. In the modern Hellenic Army the rank is superior to a Tagmatarchis (Major) and inferior to a Syntagmatarchis (Colonel). The insignia consists of a flame and two golden stars.

Most commissioned officers retire in this rank. Promotions to Syntagmatarchis and above are open to a few but this is most often based on the personal charisma and political contacts of the candidate rather than seniority.

Hellenic Army officers
Military ranks of Greece